The flicker fusion threshold, critical flicker frequency (CFF) or flicker fusion rate, is a concept in the psychophysics of vision.  It is defined as the frequency at which an intermittent light stimulus appears to be completely steady to the average human observer. A traditional term for flicker fusion is "persistence of vision", but this has also been used to describe positive afterimages or motion blur. Although flicker can be detected for many waveforms representing time-variant fluctuations of intensity, it is conventionally, and most easily, studied in terms of sinusoidal modulation of intensity.

There are seven parameters that determine the ability to detect the flicker:
 the frequency of the modulation; 
 the amplitude or depth of the modulation (i.e., what is the maximum percent decrease in the illumination intensity from its peak value); 
 the average (or maximum—these can be inter-converted if modulation depth is known) illumination intensity; 
 the wavelength (or wavelength range) of the illumination (this parameter and the illumination intensity can be combined into a single parameter for humans or other animals for which the sensitivities of rods and cones are known as a function of wavelength using the luminous flux function); 
 the position on the retina at which the stimulation occurs (due to the different distribution of photoreceptor types at different positions); 
 the degree of light or dark adaptation, i.e., the duration and intensity of previous exposure to background light, which affects both the intensity sensitivity and the time resolution of vision;
 physiological factors such as age and fatigue.

Explanation
As long as the modulation frequency is kept above the fusion threshold, the perceived intensity can be changed by changing the relative periods of light and darkness. One can prolong the dark periods and thus darken the image; therefore the effective and average brightness are equal. This is known as the Talbot-Plateau law. Like all psychophysical thresholds, the flicker fusion threshold is a statistical rather than an absolute quantity. There is a range of frequencies within which flicker sometimes will be seen and sometimes will not be seen, and the threshold is the frequency at which flicker is detected on 50% of trials.

Different points in the visual system have very different critical flicker fusion rate (CFF) sensitivities; the overall threshold frequency for perception cannot exceed the slowest of these for a given modulation amplitude. Each cell type integrates signals differently. For example, rod photoreceptor cells, which are exquisitely sensitive and capable of single-photon detection, are very sluggish, with time constants in mammals of about 200 ms. Cones, in contrast, while having much lower intensity sensitivity, have much better time resolution than rods do. For both rod- and cone-mediated vision, the fusion frequency increases as a function of illumination intensity, until it reaches a plateau corresponding to the maximal time resolution for each type of vision. The maximal fusion frequency for rod-mediated vision reaches a plateau at about 15 hertz (Hz), whereas cones reach a plateau, observable only at very high illumination intensities, of about 60 Hz.

In addition to increasing with average illumination intensity, the fusion frequency also increases with the extent of modulation (the maximal relative decrease in light intensity presented); for each frequency and average illumination, there is a characteristic modulation threshold, below which the flicker cannot be detected, and for each modulation depth and average illumination, there is a characteristic frequency threshold. These values vary with the wavelength of illumination, because of the wavelength dependence of photoreceptor sensitivity, and they vary with the position of the illumination within the retina, because of the concentration of cones in central regions including the fovea and the macula, and the dominance of rods in the peripheral regions of the retina.

Technological considerations

Display frame rate
Flicker fusion is important in all technologies for presenting moving images, nearly all of which depend on presenting a rapid succession of static images (e.g. the frames in a cinema film, TV show, or a digital video file).  If the frame rate falls below the flicker fusion threshold for the given viewing conditions, flicker will be apparent to the observer, and movements of objects on the film will appear jerky. For the purposes of presenting moving images, the human flicker fusion threshold is usually taken between 60 and 90 Hz, though in certain cases it can be higher by an order of magnitude. In practice, movies are recorded at 24 frames per second and displayed by repeating each frame two or three times for a flicker of 48 or 72 Hz. Standard-definition television operates at 25 or 30 frames per second, or sometimes at 50 or 60 (half-)frames per second through interlacing. High-definition video is displayed at 24, 25, 30, 60 frames per second or higher.

The flicker fusion threshold does not prevent indirect detection of a high frame rate, such as the phantom array effect or wagon-wheel effect, as human-visible side effects of a finite frame rate were still seen on an experimental 480 Hz display.

Display refresh rate
Cathode ray tube (CRT) displays usually by default operated at a vertical scan rate of 60 Hz, which often resulted in noticeable flicker. Many systems allowed increasing the rate to higher values such as 72, 75 or 100 Hz to avoid this problem. Most people do not detect flicker above 400 Hz.
Other display technologies do not flicker noticeably, so the frame rate is less important. Liquid-crystal display (LCD) flat panels do not seem to flicker at all, as the backlight of the screen operates at a very high frequency of nearly 200 Hz, and each pixel is changed on a scan rather than briefly turning on and then off as in CRT displays. However, the nature of the back-lighting used can induce flicker light-emitting diodes (LEDs) cannot be easily dimmed, and therefore use pulse-width modulation to create the illusion of dimming, and the frequency used can be perceived as flicker by sensitive users.

Lighting

Flicker is also important in the field of domestic (alternating current) lighting, where noticeable flicker can be caused by varying electrical loads, and hence can be very disturbing to electric utility customers. Most electricity providers have maximum flicker limits that they try to meet for domestic customers.

Fluorescent lamps using conventional magnetic ballasts flicker at twice the supply frequency. Electronic ballasts do not produce light flicker since the phosphor persistence is longer than a half cycle of the higher operation frequency of 20 kHz. The 100–120 Hz flicker produced by magnetic ballasts is associated with headaches and eyestrain.
Individuals with high critical flicker fusion threshold are particularly affected by light from fluorescent fixtures that have magnetic ballasts: their EEG alpha waves are markedly attenuated and they perform office tasks with greater speed and decreased accuracy. The problems are not observed with electronic ballasts. Ordinary people have better reading performance using high-frequency (20–60 kHz) electronic ballasts than magnetic ballasts, although the effect was small except at high contrast ratio.

The flicker of fluorescent lamps, even with magnetic ballasts, is so rapid that it is unlikely to present a hazard to individuals with epilepsy. Early studies suspected a relationship between the flickering of fluorescent lamps with magnetic ballasts and repetitive movement in autistic children. However, these studies had interpretive problems and have not been replicated.

LED lamps generally do not benefit from flicker attenuation through phosphor persistence, the notable exception being white LEDs. Flicker at frequencies as high as 2000 Hz (2 kHz) can be perceived by humans during saccades, and frequencies above 3000 Hz (3 kHz) have been recommended to avoid human biological effects.

Visual phenomena 
In some cases, it is possible to see flicker at rates beyond 2000 Hz (2 kHz) in the case of high-speed eye movements (saccades) or object motion, via the "phantom array" effect. Fast-moving flickering objects zooming across view (either by object motion, or by eye motion such as rolling eyes), can cause a dotted or multicolored blur instead of a continuous blur, as if they were multiple objects.  Stroboscopes are sometimes used to induce this effect intentionally.  
Some special effects, such as certain kinds of electronic glowsticks commonly seen at outdoor events, have the appearance of a solid color when motionless but produce a multicolored or dotted blur when waved about in motion.  These are typically LED-based glow sticks.  The variation of the duty cycle upon the LED(s), results in usage of less power while by the properties of flicker fusion having the direct effect of varying the brightness.  When moved, if the frequency of duty cycle of the driven LED(s) is below the flicker fusion threshold timing differences between the on/off state of the LED(s) becomes evident, and the color(s) appear as evenly spaced points in the peripheral vision.

A related phenomenon is the rainbow effect, where different colors are displayed in different places on the screen for the same object due to fast motion.

Flicker
Flicker is the perception of visual fluctuations in intensity and unsteadiness in the presence of a light stimulus, that is seen by a static observer within a static environment. Flicker that is visible to the human eye will operate at a frequency of up to 80 Hz.

Stroboscopic effect
The stroboscopic effect is sometimes used to "stop motion" or to study small differences in repetitive motions. The stroboscopic effect refers to the phenomenon that occurs when there is a change in perception of motion, caused by a light stimulus that is seen by a static observer within a dynamic environment. The stroboscopic effect will typically occur within a frequency range between 80 and 2000 Hz, though can go well beyond to 10,000 Hz for a percentage of population.

Phantom array
Phantom array, also known as the ghosting effect, occurs when there is a change in perception of shapes and spatial positions of objects. The phenomenon is caused by a light stimulus in combination with rapid eye movements (saccades) of an observer in a static environment. Similar to the stroboscopic effect, the phantom effect will also occur at similar frequency ranges. The mouse arrow is a common example of the phantom array effect.

Non-human species
The flicker fusion threshold also varies between species. Pigeons have been shown to have higher threshold than humans (100 Hz vs. 75 Hz), and the same is probably true for all birds, particularly birds of prey. Many mammals have a higher proportion of rods in their retina than humans do, and it is likely that they would also have higher flicker fusion thresholds. This has been confirmed in dogs.

Research also shows that size and metabolic rate are two factors that come into play: small animals with high metabolic rate tend to have high flicker fusion thresholds.

See also
Broca-Sulzer effect
 CDR computerized assessment system
 Frame rate
 Persistence of vision
 Refresh rate
 Tweening

References

External links
 
 *IEC Flicker Meter (PDF)
The Flicker Fusion Factor Why we can't drive safely at high speed
Webvision.med.utah.edu section concerning the psychophysics of time in vision
(Wayback Machine copies)

Vision